Minuscule 350 (in the Gregory-Aland numbering), ε 413 (Soden), is a Greek minuscule manuscript of the New Testament, on parchment. Paleographically it has been assigned to the 11th century. 
It has marginalia.

Description 

The codex contains a complete text of the four Gospels on 305 parchment leaves with only one lacuna (John 21:9-25). The text is written in one column per page, in 21 lines per page.

There is also a division according to the Ammonian Sections (in Mark 241 Sections, the last in 16:20), without references to the Eusebian Canons.

It contains lectionary markings at the margin (for liturgical use), and pictures (portraits of Evangelists). Synaxarion, Menologion were added in the 14th century. 
The first four paper leaves with text of Matthew 1:1-4:25 was added in the 16th century.

Text 

The Greek text of the codex is a representative of the Byzantine text-type. Hermann von Soden classified it as Kak. Aland placed it in Category V.

According to the Claremont Profile Method it creates to the textual family M350 in Luke 1, Luke 10, and Luke 20.

History 

The manuscript was bought in 1606 in Taranto. It was examined by Scholz.

The manuscript was added to the list of New Testament manuscripts by Scholz (1794-1852). 
C. R. Gregory saw it in 1886.

The manuscript is currently housed at the Biblioteca Ambrosiana (B. 62 sup.) in Milan.

See also 

 List of New Testament minuscules
 Biblical manuscript
 Textual criticism

References

Further reading 

 J. M. A. Scholz, Biblisch-kritische Reise (Leipzig, 1823), p. 70-73.
 Catalogus graecorum Bibliothecace Ambrosianae (Mediolani 1906), vol. I, pp. 109–110.

Greek New Testament minuscules
11th-century biblical manuscripts
Manuscripts of the Ambrosiana collections